BC Wolves is a Lithuanian professional basketball club based in the city of Vilnius. The team competes in the Lithuanian Basketball League (LKL) and the European North Basketball League (ENBL).

History
The organisation was founded on 2 June 2022, with the name Wolves referring to the mythical iron wolf and the founding legend of the city of Vilnius. The license of BC Dzūkija was used to play in the Lietuvos krepšinio lyga (LKL) starting immediately from the 2022–23 season, which will be the club's inaugural season. Due to upcoming reconstruction of Avia Solutions Group Arena, home matches will temporarily be played in Alytus Arena.

Players

Current roster

Depth chart

Squad changes for/during 2022–23 season

In

|}

Out

|}

Season by season

References

External links

BC Wolves profile in LKL 
Basketball Holding Company 

Basketball teams in Lithuania
Sport in Alytus
2022 establishments in Lithuania
Basketball teams established in 2022